Naomi Rivera (born May 10, 1963) is a former United States politician of the Democratic Party who represented District 80 in the New York State Assembly from 2005 to 2012. Her district encompassed Morris Park, Bronx Park East, Pelham Gardens, and Norwood, among other communities located in the Bronx.

Before being elected to the Assembly, she previously served as Director of Special Events for the Bronx Borough President's office and Deputy Chief Clerk of the Bronx Board of Elections. On September 13, 2012, Naomi Rivera lost to Mark Gjonaj in the Democratic primary race.

She is the daughter of New York Assemblyman Jose Rivera and sister of New York City Councilman Joel Rivera.

References

External links
New York State Assembly Member Website

Democratic Party members of the New York State Assembly
Women state legislators in New York (state)
Living people
American politicians of Puerto Rican descent
Hispanic and Latino American women in politics
21st-century American politicians
21st-century American women politicians
Politicians from the Bronx
Hispanic and Latino American state legislators in New York (state)
Puerto Rican people in New York (state) politics
1963 births